4 Camelopardalis is a probable multiple star in the northern constellation of Camelopardalis, located 177 light years away from the Sun, based upon parallax. With a combined apparent visual magnitude of 5.29, it is visible to the naked eye as a faint, white-hued star. The system's proper motion makes it a candidate for membership in the IC 2391 supercluster. They are moving away from the Earth with a heliocentric radial velocity of 22.5 km/s.

The brighter member, designated component A, is classified as an Am star, which indicates that the spectrum shows abnormalities of certain elements. It is an estimated 560 million years old and is spinning with a projected rotational velocity of 75 The star has 2.01 times the mass of the Sun and 2.57 times the Sun's radius. It is radiating 18 times the Sun's luminosity from its photosphere at an effective temperature of 7,700 K.

There is a faint, magnitude 9.49 companion at an angular separation of  – component B; the pair most likely form a binary systemwith a period of about 90 years.

References

External links
 HR 1511
 CCDM J04480+5645
 Image 4 Camelopardalis

Am stars
Multiple stars
Camelopardalis (constellation)
BD+56 0973
Camelopardalis, 04
030121
022287
1511